Watha can refer to:
Watha, North Carolina, a township in the U.S. state of North Carolina
Watha dialect, part of the indigenous Australian Western Desert Language
Watha people, a hunter-gatherer culture in East Africa (mainly Kenya)